The 2000 OFC Nations Cup was held in Papeete, Tahiti. The six participating teams were Australia and New Zealand who qualified as of right, the Solomon Islands and Vanuatu who qualified from the Melanesia Cup, the Cook Islands and Tahiti who qualified from the Polynesia Cup. Australia beat New Zealand 2–0 in the final. The Solomon Islands beat Vanuatu 2–1 for third place.

Fiji qualified to this edition but then withdrew due to the 2000 Fijian coup d'état and was replaced by Vanuatu.

Qualification

2000 Melanesia Cup

Solomon Islands and Vanuatu* qualified.

 Fiji were replaced by Vanuatu due to civil unrest taking place in Fiji.

2000 Polynesia Cup

Tahiti and Cook Islands qualified.

Venue

Squads
See 2000 OFC Nations Cup squads.

Group stage

Group A

Group B

Knockout stage

Semi-finals

Third place match

Final

Goalscorers
5 goals
  Clayton Zane
  Craig Foster
4 goals
  Kevin Muscat
2 goals

  David Zdrilic
  Paul Agostino
  Chris Killen
  Simon Elliott
  Commins Menapi
  Gideon Omokirio
  Richard Iwai

1 goal

  Danny Tiatto
  Pablo Cardozo
  Scott Chipperfield
  Shaun Murphy
  Stan Lazaridis
  Steve Corica
  Tony Popovic
  Daniel Shepherd
  Chris Jackson
  Jonathan Perry
  Kris Bouckenooghe
  Batram Suri
  Henry Kotto
  Jack Samani
  Harold Amaru
  Jean-Loup Rousseau
  Georgina Tura
  Jimmy Ben
  Lexa Bibi

Own goal
  Gideon Omokirio (playing against Australia)

External links
 RSSSF Accessed 21 February 2010.

 
2000
Football in French Polynesia
Nations
2000
2000 in French Polynesian sport
2000 in Australian soccer
2000 in New Zealand association football
Papeete
June 2000 sports events in Oceania